Verticordia is a genus of marine bivalve molluscs in the family Verticordiidae. >

They are mostly small, live in deep water and have roughly equal-sized, well-inflated, fragile shells which are pearly inside.

Species 
The following is a list of species according to the World Register of Marine Species:
 Verticordia australiensis E.A.Smith 
 Verticordia bordaensis Cotton & Godfrey 
 † Verticordia cardiiformis  J.C.Sowerby 
 † Verticordia densicostata P. Marshall 
 † Verticordia excavata Pritchard, 1901 
 Verticordia expansa Prashad 
 Verticordia granulifera (Verrill) 
 Verticordia guineensis Thiele 
 Verticordia inornata Jaeckel & Thiele 
 Verticordia neozelanica (extinct) (Suter) 
 Verticordia ouricuri Oliveira & Absalão 
 † Verticordia parisiensis Deshayes, 1856 
 † Verticordia pectinata Tate, 1887 
 Verticordia perversa Dall 
 Verticordia quadrata E.A.Smith 
 † Verticordia rhomboidea Tate, 1887 
 Verticordia seguenzae Dall 
 Verticordia tasmanica May 
 Verticordia tenerrima Jaeckel & Thiele 
 Verticordia woodii E.A.Smith

References

External links
 Poutiers, J. M.; Bernard, F. R. (1995). Carnivorous bivalve molluscs (Anomalodesmata) from the tropical western Pacific Ocean, with a proposed classification and a catalogue of Recent species. in: Bouchet, P. (Ed.) Résultats des Campagnes MUSORSTOM 14. Mémoires du Muséum national d'Histoire naturelle. Série A, Zoologie. 167: 107-187
 [ -http://www.vliz.be/imisdocs/publications/ocrd/254404.pdf Gofas, S.; Le Renard, J.; Bouchet, P. (2001). Mollusca. in: Costello, M.J. et al. (eds), European Register of Marine Species: a check-list of the marine species in Europe and a bibliography of guides to their identification. Patrimoines Naturels. 50: 180-213]
  Neave, Sheffield Airey. (1939-1996). Nomenclator Zoologicus vol. 1-10 Online

Verticordiidae
Bivalve genera